Moshe Moskowitz (1925 – 24 January 2021) was an Israeli politician, head of the Shafir Regional Council (1952–1979), and founder of the Gush Etzion settlement.

References 

1925 births
2021 deaths
Gush Etzion
Israeli Jews
Jewish Israeli politicians
Israeli settlers